Rituparna Sengupta is an Indian actress and producer who is known for her work in Bengali cinema, Hindi cinema and Bangla cinema. She has appeared in a total of 218 films among which 181 are Bengali films, 33 Hindi films and one each in English, Malayalam, Kannada ond Oriya film. 

Sengupta made her screen debut opposite Kushal Chakraborty in his Bengali fantasy TV series Shwet Kapot (1989) broadcast on DD Bangla.

Hindi films

Films

Tv Series

Bengali TV series

Bengali films

Telugu film

Malayalam film

Kannada film

Odia film

Reality Shows

Mahalaya

References

External links
 

Sengupta, Rituparna
Sengupta, Rituparna